Aleix is a Catalan given name for males. It is the Catalan form of the name Alexis and may refer to:

 Aleix Alcaraz (born 1990), Spanish professional racing driver
 Aleix Coch (born 1991), Spanish football player
 Aleix Espargaró (born 1989), Spanish motorcycle road racer
 Aleix Suñé (born 1986), Spanish para-alpine ski guide
 Aleix Vidal (born 1989), Spanish football player

References 

Catalan masculine given names